Shrimati is a 2022 Indian Bengali language film written and directed by Arjunn Dutta. The film is produced by Kan Singh Sodha under the banner of KSS Productions. The film features Swastika Mukherjee and Soham Chakraborty in lead roles.

Cast 

 Swastika Mukherjee
 Soham Chakraborty 
 Trina Saha
 Kheya Chattopadhyay 
 Uday Pratap Singh 
 Barkha Sengupta
 Debjani Bose

Release 
The trailer of the film released on 8 June 2022. The film was released theatrically on 8 July 2022.

Soundtrack

References

External links

Bengali-language Indian films
2020s Bengali-language films
Films directed by Arjunn Dutta